Edwin Samuel Williams (born 1948) is an American linguist and Emeritus Professor of linguistics at Princeton University.
He is known for his expertise on morphology and syntax.
Williams is credited as the creator of representation theory.

Books
 On the Definition of Word, Anna Maria Di Sciullo and Edwin Williams, MIT Press
 Thematic Structure in Syntax, MIT Press
 Regimes of Derivation in Syntax and Morphology, Routledge
 Representation Theory, MIT Press

References

1948 births
Living people
Morphologists
Linguists from the United States
Princeton University faculty
MIT School of Humanities, Arts, and Social Sciences alumni